Packt is a publishing company founded in 2003 and headquartered in Birmingham, UK, with offices in Mumbai, India.  

Packt primarily publishes print and electronic books and videos relating to information technology, including programming, web design, data analysis and hardware.

Alongside traditional publishing activities, Packt supports and promotes open source projects and concepts. In March 2011, following its 'Believe in Open Source campaign' Packt announced that its donations to open source projects have exceeded $300,000.

Company
Founded in 2003 by David and Rachel Maclean, Packt Publishing provides books, eBooks, video tutorials, and articles for software engineers, web developers, system administrators and users. The company states that it supports and publishes books on smaller projects and subjects that standard publishing companies cannot make profitable. The company's business model, which involves print on demand publishing and selling direct, enables it to make money selling books with lower unit sales. The aim of this business model is to give authors high royalty rates and the opportunity to write on topics that standard publishers tend to avoid.

In 2018 Packt's revenue reached 18.4 million pounds, a 28% increase over the previous year, attributed to increased market share over the period.

In 2019 Packt stated it had published 6,500 books over its 16 years of operation.

Books
Packt offers printed version of their books shipped to Europe, North America and selected Asian countries. In addition, they offer PDF versions of all of their books for download and in August 2010 began offering them in ePub and Mobi format. These eBooks were made free from digital rights management in March 2009. Packt books are also available via the Perlego platform, while some (but not all) are accessible on the Safari Books Online system.

Packt Enterprise and Packt Open Source
In April 2010, Packt launched two new brands, Packt Enterprise and Packt Open Source, with the release of Microsoft Silverlight 4 Data and Services Cookbook and Moodle 1.9 Theme Design. Packt Enterprise focuses on technologies produced by businesses for use in other corporations, while Packt Open Source focuses on technologies built around open source licences.

These two brands do not encompass all of Packt's books, and it will continue to publish into areas which are not necessarily classifiable as open source or enterprise

Open source project royalties
Packt supports and promotes open source projects and concepts. When a book written on an open source project is sold, Packt pays a royalty directly to that project. This scheme has resulted in the company providing sustainable revenues to many of the open source projects since 2004.

In March 2011, following its 'Believe in Open Source campaign' Packt announced that its donations to Open Source projects have surpassed the $300,000 mark.

Open Source Awards
The Open Source Awards, launched as the spen source CMS Award in 2006, was created with the aim of encouraging, supporting, recognising and rewarding open source projects. The Open Source Award was re-launched in July 2010 to allow a wider range of open source projects to enter the contest.

In November 2006, Joomla! was announced as the first winner of the Award receiving $5,000. Drupal finished second receiving $3,000 with Plone finishing third and receiving $2,000.

Since 2006, Packt has run the Award annually, each time expanding the categories and prize money to benefit the open source community.

Previous winners in the Awards vary from WordPress to MODx. In 2010, WordPress received the Open Source CMS Hall of Fame award.

The winners in the 2011 Open Source Awards are as follows:

 Open Source CMS: Joomla
 Open Source Mobile Toolkits and Libraries: jQuery Mobile
 Most Promising Open Source Project: ImpressPages
 Open Source Business Applications: PrestaShop
 Open Source JavaScript Libraries: jQuery
 Open Source Multimedia Software: Blender

References

External links 
 

Book publishing companies of the United Kingdom
Computer book publishing companies
Drupal